is a railway station in the city of Toyota, Aichi Prefecture, Japan, operated by the third sector Aichi Loop Railway Company.

Lines

Station layout
The station has two has two opposed side platforms, connected by a footbridge.  The station building has automated ticket machines, TOICA automated turnstiles and is staffed.

Platforms

Adjacent stations

Station history
Mikawa-Toyota Station was opened on December 27, 1937 as a station on the privately held Mikawa Railway Okazaki Line. The Mikawa Railway was merged with Meitetsu June 1, 1941, and the Okazaki Line became the Meitetsu Okazaki Line. The station name was renamed  on October 1, 1959. On August 30, 1973, the extension from this station to Koromo Station was discontinued.

With the privatization of the JNR on April 1, 1987, the station came under control of the JR Central. The station was transferred to the third sector Aichi Loop Railway Company on January 31, 1988, and reverted to its original name.

Passenger statistics
In fiscal 2017, the station was used by an average of 14,299 passengers daily.

Surrounding area
 Toyota Motors Kaikan
 Yamanote Elementary School

See also
 List of railway stations in Japan

References

External links

Official home page 

Railway stations in Japan opened in 1937
Railway stations in Aichi Prefecture
Toyota, Aichi